Ertuğrul İçingir (born 22 November 1975 in Adana) is a Turkish windsurfer. He has competed in three time Olympic Games, firstly in the Mistral One Design Class, and then at the 2008 Summer Olympics RS:X (sailboard) event.

Results

References

External links
 
 
 

1975 births
Living people
Turkish male sailors (sport)
Olympic sailors of Turkey
Sailors at the 2000 Summer Olympics – Mistral One Design
Sailors at the 2004 Summer Olympics – Mistral One Design
Sailors at the 2008 Summer Olympics – RS:X
Turkish windsurfers
Sportspeople from Adana